Patan Devi, also called Maa Patneshwari, is the oldest and one of the most sacred temples of Patna, Bihar. It is regarded as one of the 51 Siddha Shakti Pithas in India. According to Puranic legends, the 'right thigh' of the corpse of Devi Sati had fallen here when it was chopped off by Lord Vishnu with his 'Sudarshan Chakra'. The ancient temple, originally called Maa Sarvanand Kari Patneshwari, is believed to be the abode of the goddess Durga.

The name of the city Patna is widely believed to have been derived from the name of the Badi Patan Devi Temple. Some, however, doubt whether the name of Patna is derived from this temple. According to them, the name is derived from patan, which means a town and Patna was a big place of export and import.

History

Mythology
According to the Hindu mythology, it is believed that the right thigh of Devi Sati fell in Magadh and it is said that the part of the body of Sati fell in both Maharajganj and Chowk areas in Old Patna city. At these places, the Badi Patan Devi temple and the Chhoti Patan Devi temple were built. According to the Tantra Charumani, the small images of the Bari Patan Devi Temple, Patna are the Goddess Mahakali, Mahalakshmi and Mahasaraswati. In Hindu mythology, these Goddesses protected Putraka, who was the founder of Pataliputra. A strange stone image has been found in a tank near the Bari Patan Devi Temple, Patna. That image has been kept in the eastern veranda of the main temple where this stone is being worshiped regularly.

Bari Patan Devi 
The Bari Patan Devi Temple, Patna is facing the North, towards the Ganges river. The statues of the temple are all made up in black stone. At the entrance of the temple there is a portico of dimension . First three goddesses are attired in sarees.

Devotees can go to the temple at any time of the day. The temple does not distinguish between any caste or creed and hence is open for all religions and castes. The temple remains open from morning 6 am to 10 pm. Tuesday is a special day for the devotees and a large number of worshipers visit the temple. Promises are being made before the Goddess and on the fulfillment of the wishes devotees offer gifts and sarees in the temple.

Chhoti Patan Devi

This temple is situated in the Chowk area of Patna City and once was considered as the main presiding deity of Patna. Over the years it has slipped to the second position of eminence, after the Bari Patan Devi temple, as city's presiding deity, with epithet 'Choti' (smaller) to the more popular one, the Bari (bigger) Patan Devi. But a historian called Buchanan was very specific in stating that it was this very temple (Choti Patendevi) which held the primary position as the city's presiding deity during 18th and early 19th century.

The present temple does not seem to be of any great antiquity. The images inside the temple, if Buchanan is to be believed, were installed by Man Singh, the famous general of the Mughal emperor Akbar. The temple, however, houses a host of intact and severed Brahmanical images, including, Ganesh, Vishnu and Surya. Beyond the temple, but within its precincts, lie in open fragments of door jumbs/lintels and yet other set of images. Of these, an impressive, but broken sun-image is the most prominent. According to many historians, it is very likely that some early medieval temple was built here sometime in 9th-11th Century A.D. and these fragmentary stray sculptural/structural relics are only its ruins. Probably, these were reinstalled in a new temple, built during the 16th-17th century by Man Singh. But authentic information on this count is woefully wanting.

Important festivals
As in many other places, a mela is also held near these temples at the time of Vijayadashmi. On Saptami, Ashtami and Navami (Durga Puja)during the mela about 1000 people come to offer prayers daily at either of the two temples. Visitors generally bring sweets, garlands and fruits to offer to the deities. The priest of the temple takes some quantity of the prasad and returns the rest to the devotees. He marks their forehead with Rori (red powder). The devotees also give some money to the priest as dakshina.

As regards the routine of the rituals, the deity is daily bathed morning and evening and this is followed by offerings of prasad (fruits and sweetmeats etc.) and aarti with the usual reciting of hymns by the priest, accompanied by the ringing of bells.

Reaching there
The place can be easily reached from the Patna Bus Station. The temple is just approx. 10 km from the Patna Junction Railway Station. Buses are also available  Rickshaws, taxis etc. are available at Patna, Gulzarbagh and Patna City railway stations.

See also

Mahavir Mandir
Takht Sri Patna Sahib
Hinduism
Baba Garib Sthan Mandir

External links
 Maa Patandevi: official Website
 Maa Patneshwari: Official Website
 Maa Patneshwari: Official Website
 Hindubooks reference for Patan Devi
 Patan Devi and Durga Puja
 Bari Patan Devi
 Chhoti Patan Devi

References 

Durga temples
Hindu temples in Bihar
Shakti temples
Tourist attractions in Patna
Religious buildings and structures in Patna